Louise Hansegaard Ellebæk (born 10 March 1998) is a Danish handball player for Silkeborg-Voel KFUM and the formerly Danish national junior team. 

She also represented Denmark in the 2017 Women's U-19 European Handball Championship, were she got Runners-up, and in the 2018 Women's Junior World Handball Championship, placing 6th.

She was called up to represent the Danish national team on 28 September 2018, but she got injured just days before the match.

References

1998 births
Living people
Danish female handball players